Dr.I may refer to:

 Dr.I, a German designation for several World War I triplanes
 AEG Dr.I
 Fokker Dr.I